Caravino is a comune (municipality) in the Metropolitan City of Turin in the Italian region Piedmont, located about  northeast of Turin.

Caravino borders the following municipalities: Albiano d'Ivrea, Azeglio, Strambino, Settimo Rottaro, Vestignè, Cossano Canavese, and Borgomasino.

References

Cities and towns in Piedmont